Younes Ahmed (born 17 July 1963) is a former Qatari football goalkeeper. He played for both Al Rayyan and the Qatari national team.  He competed in the men's tournament at the 1984 Summer Olympics.

References

External links
 

1963 births
Living people
Qatari footballers
Qatar international footballers
1984 AFC Asian Cup players
1988 AFC Asian Cup players
1992 AFC Asian Cup players
Al-Rayyan SC players
Qatar Stars League players
Association football goalkeepers
Olympic footballers of Qatar
Footballers at the 1984 Summer Olympics